Pissonotus marginatus is a species in the family Delphacidae ("delphacid planthoppers"), in the order Hemiptera ("true bugs, cicadas, hoppers, aphids and allies").
Pissonotus marginatus is found in North America.

References

Further reading
 American Insects: A Handbook of the Insects of America North of Mexico, Ross H. Arnett. 2000. CRC Press.
 Bartlett, Charles R., and Lewis L. Deitz (2000). Revision of the New World Delphacid Planthopper Genus Pissonotus (Hemiptera: Fulgoroidea). Thomas Say Publications in Entomology: Monographs, vi + 234.
 Metcalf, Z. P. (1943). General Catalogue of the Hemiptera, Fascicle IV: Fulgoroidea, Part 3: Araeopidae (Delphacidae), 552.

Delphacini